A by-election was held for the New South Wales Legislative Assembly electorate of Yass Plains on 6 November 1865 because Peter Faucett accepted an appointment as a judge of the Supreme Court.

Dates

Result

Peter Faucett accepted appointment as a judge of the Supreme Court.

See also
Electoral results for the district of Yass Plains
List of New South Wales state by-elections

References

1865 elections in Australia
New South Wales state by-elections
1860s in New South Wales